Neripteron auriculatum is a species of brackish water and freshwater snail, an aquatic gastropod mollusk in the family Neritidae, the nerites.

Neripteron auriculatum is the type species of the genus Neripteron.

Distribution
India

Description

Human use
It is a part of ornamental pet trade for freshwater aquaria.

References 

 Turton W.H. (1932). Marine Shells of Port Alfred, S. Africa. Humphrey Milford, London, xvi + 331 pp., 70 pls
 Eichhorst T.E. (2016). Neritidae of the world. Volume 1. Harxheim: Conchbooks. 695 pp

External links
 Lamarck, J. B. P. A. de M. de. (1816). Tableau encyclopédique et méthodique des trois règnes de la nature, Mollusques et polypes divers. Part 23
 Broderip, W. J.; Sowerby, G. B., I. (1829). Observations on new or interesting Mollusca contained, for the most part, in the Museum of the Zoological Society. Zoological Journal. 4: 359-379
 Souleyet (L.F.A.). (1842). Description de cinq nouvelles espèces de nérites fluviales provenant du voyage de la Bonite. Revue Zoologique par la Société Cuviérienne. (1842): 269-270
 Reeve, L. A. (1855-1856). Monograph of the genus Neritina. In: Conchologia Iconica, or, illustrations of the shells of molluscous animals, vol. 9, pls 1-37 and unpaginated text. L. Reeve & Co., London

Neritidae
Gastropods described in 1816